Tommy Black (born Fredrik Halldin) is a record producer from Sweden. He has worked with Kendrick Lamar, Schoolboy Q, Dr. Dre, Big Pooh, Ab-Soul and Shade Sheist.
He was one of the producers of the 5 Grammy awarded album To Pimp A Butterfly by American rapper Kendrick Lamar. In 2017, Tommy Black received the award of SKAP - The Swedish Society of Songwriters, Composers and Authors.

Production credits
 Joe Lefty – HeartChakra
"The Dove"
"Dive Deep"
"Keeper"

 Chapee – Mode7ty
"Come thru"
"Sumtimes"
"Out in Space" (featuring Mapei)
"Complicated" (featuring Faye)
"We Travel" (featuring Mykestro)
"Time Is Free"
"Last Call"

 Tommy Black – The Nine Lives of Tommy Black
"The Nine Lives of Tommy Black"
"Movement"
"Delusion"
"Look Outside"
"Inside the Space Capsule" 
"Moonscape"
"Streets of Atlantis"
"Sly Black & the Zodiac"
"Time Voyage"

 Kendrick Lamar – Section.80
"Chapter Six"
"Blow My High" 

 Ab-Soul – Longterm Mentality
"Almost There" (featuring BJ the Chicago Kid)

 Ab-Soul – Control System
"The Book of Soul"

 Butch Cassidy – I'm here
"Street Life" (Pr1me & Drastic))

Accolades

Grammy Awards

|-
|rowspan="2"|2016
|"To Pimp a Butterfly" (as producer)
|Album of the Year
|
|-
|"To Pimp a Butterfly" (as producer)
|Best Rap Album
|

References

Living people
Hip hop record producers
Swedish record producers
Record producers
Year of birth missing (living people)